Salată de boeuf ("beef salad") is a traditional Romanian and Moldovan dish, generally served during all festive and special occasions. It is a combination of finely chopped beef (or sometimes chicken, or turkey breast) and root vegetables, folded in mayonnaise and  finished with murături, pickled vegetable garnishes. It can be made vegetarian, too.

The dish is usually made up in large quantities for the whole party on occasions such as Christmas Eve. It's eaten as a side dish/salad to fried meats or as an appetiser/entrée. Slight differences exist in quantities, and these vary according to taste.

The name may suggest a French culinary influence as the word bœuf is French for beef. It closely resembles Olivier salad (Russian salad).

See also
 List of salads

References

External links
 Salată de boeuf at gourmet-European-recipes.com
 Sondaj:Șase din zece români pun mazăre în salata boeuf și 70% preferă salata boeuf cu pui în loc de vită at temananc.ro

Romanian appetizers
Moldovan dishes
Christmas in Romania
Beef dishes
Christmas food
Salads